The 439th Airlift Wing (439 AW) is an active United States Air Force Reserve unit.  It is assigned to the Air Force Reserve Command, Fourth Air Force, and is based at Westover Air Reserve Base, Massachusetts.

The peacetime mission includes recruiting, training and supervision of personnel to assure mission readiness. The wing is also responsible for the management of aircraft maintenance and all assigned Air Force combat support real property, equipment and supplies.

Units
The wing consists of the following component groups:

439th Operations Group (439 OG)
337th Airlift Squadron (337 AS) C-5M Galaxy
439th Aeromedical Staging Squadron (439 ASTS)
439th Aeromedical Evacuation Squadron (439 AES)
439th Operations Support Squadron (439 OSS)
439th Contingency Response Flight (439 CRF)

439th Maintenance Group (439 MXG)
439th Maintenance Squadron (439 MXS)
439th Aircraft Maintenance Squadron (439 AMXS)

439th Mission Support Group (439 MSG)
42d Aerial Port Squadron (42 APS)
58th Aerial Port Squadron (58 APS)
439th Civil Engineering Squadron (439 CES)
439th Communications Squadron (439 CS)
439th Force Support Squadron (439 FSS)
439th Security Forces Squadron (439 SFS)
439th Logistics Readiness Squadron (439 LRS)

History
 For additional lineage and history, see 439th Operations Group

The 439th Airlift Wing traces its origins to the 439 Troop Carrier Wing, Medium, established on 19 May 1949. Activated in the Reserve on 27 Jun 1949 at Selfridge AFB, Michigan with T-6 Texan trainer aircraft. Assigned to 439 Troop Carrier Group. Ordered to active service on 1 April 1951.  Inactivated on 3 April 1951.  Redesignated as 439 Fighter-Bomber Wing on 26 May 1952, for fighter-bomber missions.

Activated in the Reserve on 15 June 1952.  Inactivated on 16 November 1957.  Redesignated as 439 Tactical Airlift Wing on 14 March 1974, with C-123 and C-130. Moved to Westover AFB (later, Westover ARB), MA, 1 April 1974.  Activated in the Reserve on 1 April 1974.  Redesignated as: 439th Military Airlift Wing on 1 Oct 1987, with C-5 Galaxy. The 439th flew several relief missions to Jamaica after Hurricane Gilbert devastated that island in the fall of 1988. C-130 operations ended in 1988.

The 439th airlifted troops and equipment to Panama during Operation Just Cause, the United States invasion of Panama. Redesignated 439th Airlift Wing on 1 February 1992. In August 1992, Westover C-5s ferried supplies, vehicles and personnel to Homestead AFB, Florida, to assist in the relief efforts following Hurricane Andrew.

Airlifts included troops and cargo to Europe and southwest Asia before and during the Gulf War, Patriot missiles to Israel in early 1991, and airlift of presidential helicopters to Martinque also in 1991. Provided worldwide air movement of troops, supplies, equipment and medical patients, 2000-;  transported rescue teams and equipment to New York City after the September 11 attacks terrorist attack on the US, Sep 2001; supported Operation Enduring Freedom, 2001-2002; flew tsunami relief missions in Southwest Asia, January 2005; humanitarian relief efforts after Hurricanes Katrina and Rita, August–September 2005; The wing flew relief missions after the 2010 Haiti earthquake. On June 2, 2017 the 439th received its first C-5M Super Galaxy, the first of eight destined for the wing. On September 20, 2018 the wing took delivery of its last C-5M Super Galaxy.

Lineage
 Established as 439th Troop Carrier Wing, Medium on 19 May 1949
 Activated in the Reserve on 27 June 1949
 Ordered to active service on 1 April 1951
 Inactivated on 3 April 1951
 Redesignated 439th Fighter-Bomber Wing on 26 May 1952
 Activated in the Reserve on 15 June 1952
 Inactivated on 16 November 1957
 Redesignated 439th Tactical Airlift Wing on 14 March 1974
 Activated in the Reserve on 1 April 1974
 Redesignated: 439th Military Airlift Wing on 1 October 1987
 Resesignated: 439th Airlift Wing on 1 February 1992.

Assignments
 Tenth Air Force, 27 June 1949 – 3 April 1951; 15 June 1952 – 16 November 1957
 Eastern Air Force Reserve Region, 1 April 1974
 Fourteenth Air Force, 8 October 1976
 Twenty-Second Air Force, 1 July 1993–2010
 Fourth Air Force, Current

Components
Group
 439th Troop Carrier (later, 439th Fighter-Bomber; 439th Military Airlift; 439th Operations Group): 27 June 1949 – 3 April 1951; 15 June 1952 – 16 November 1957; 1 August 1992–present
 911th Tactical Airlift Group: 1 October 1980 – 1 August 1992
 914th Tactical Airlift Group: 25 January 1976 – 1 August 1992

Squadrons
 337th Tactical (later Military) Airlift Squadron: 1 April 1974 – 1 August 1992
 731 Tactical (later Military) Airlift Squadron: 1 April 1974 – 1 October 1982.

Stations
 Selfridge AFB, Michigan, 27 June 1949 – 3 April 1951; 15 June 1952 – 16 November 1957
 Westover AFB (later, ARB), Massachusetts, 1 April 1974–present

Aircraft

 TC-46, 1949–1951
 C-46, 1952–1955
 T-28, 1953–1955
 F-51, 1953–1954
 T-33, 1953–1957

 F-80, 1953–1956
 F-84, 1956–1957
 F-86, 1957
 TC-47, 1957
 C-119, 1957

 C-123, 1974–1982
 C-130, 1974–1988
 C-5A/B 1987–2017
C-5M Super Galaxy 2017–present

Operations
Under supervision of the 2242nd Air Force Reserve Training Center, the newly established wing trained as a troop carrier organization from 1949 until 1951 and for fighter-bomber missions from 1952 to 1957.

It replaced the 901st and 905th Tactical Airlift Groups at Westover Air Reserve Base in April 1974 and assumed tactical airlift, special operations, satellite support, and aeromedical evacuation missions.  It has since taken part in tactical exercises, global airlift, and humanitarian missions.  It gained two tactical groups and the responsibility for operating the military portion of Niagara Falls International Airport on 25 January 1976 and Pittsburgh International Airport on 1 October 1980, but relinquished control of those groups in 1992.

During the 1980s, the wing took part in various training exercises involving tactical airlift and rotated personnel and aircraft to Panama.  It also provided airlift support for the movement and training of other units and conducted local proficiency flying training missions.  At the conclusion of the Iran–Iraq War in 1989, the wing transported United Nations ceasefire observers to the Persian Gulf area.  It airlifted troops and equipment to Panama during the incursion into Panama at the end of the year.  The 439th airlifted troops, equipment, and supplies to support global contingency, humanitarian, and anti-drug operations during the 1990s.  Additionally, its airlifts included troops and cargo to Europe and the Persian Gulf area before and during the Gulf War, and Patriot missiles to Israel in 1991.

Expeditions
World War II
Operation Just Cause
Operation Desert Shield
Operation Desert Storm
Operation Iraqi Freedom
Operation Enduring Freedom
Operation Freedom Sentinel
Operation Inherent Resolve
Operation New Dawn
Operation New Normal

Decorations
Air Force Outstanding Unit Awards: 1 January 1975 – 31 December 1976; 15 June 1989 – 15 June 1991; 1 October 1999 – 30 September 2001; 1 October 2001 – 30 September 2003; 1 July 2005 – 30 June 2007; 1 July 2007 – 30 June 2009

Campaign streamers
World War II: Rome-Arno; Southern France; Normandy; Northern France; Rhineland; Ardennes-Alsace; Central Europe

Unit shields

References

External links
 Westover Air Reserve Base Home Page

Military units and formations in Massachusetts
0439